is a poem written by Kenji Miyazawa, a poet from the northern prefecture of Iwate in Japan who lived from 1896 to 1933. It was written in a notebook with a pencil in 1931 while he was fighting illness in Hanamaki, and was discovered posthumously, unknown even to his family when it was published. Because "11.3" was written at the top of the opening page with blue pencil, it is presumed to have been written on November 3, 1931.

Kenji always carried a notebook and pencil with him, and there are as many as 15 notebooks. In the notebook with Ame ni mo makezu, Kenji wrote about his thoughts on his sickbed, his religious beliefs, and the important events of his life. Although Kenji did not intend to show Ame ni mo makezu to others as poetry, it has become his most widely known poem and is considered one of his masterpieces.

In November 1936, a poetry monument engraved with this work was erected in Hanamaki. The poem was popularized by being recorded in "Kaze no Matasaburo", a collection of works for children published in 1939. On April 11, 2011, the poem was read aloud in English by the President of the Cathedral of Samuel Lloyd III at a memorial service was held at the National Cathedral in Washington to mourn the victims of the Great East Japan Earthquake.

The poem 
The text of the poem is given below in Japanese, as a transliteration using romaji, and in translation. Aside from including some kanji, the poem was written in katakana rather than hiragana (see style). This was used expression like antithesis. The last sentence reveals subject.

Style 
Miyazawa chose to write the poem using katakana. This could seem to be stylistically odd from a modern perspective, as katakana is nowadays (usually) only used in Japanese writing to denote foreign words.  However, at the time, katakana rather than hiragana was the preferred syllabary.  The limited use of kanji might be viewed as a move to make his poem more accessible to the rural folk of northern Japan with whom he spent his life, or perhaps as similar to American poet E. E. Cummings's style in using primarily lower case. Another interpretation could be that, since katakana were regularly used in pre-war Japan for laws, regulations and other normative texts, the use of katakana here emphasises the normative character of this promise to self.

Notes 
 It is important to note that cold summers in Japan mean a poorer harvest, hence the line "when the summer is cold, wandering upset."

 The transliteration above is not direct, and uses a modern romaji rendering.  Miyazawa wrote in the orthography common to his time, where コハガラナクテ (kohagaranakute) would today be rendered as コワガラナクテ (kowagaranakute), イヒ (ihi) as イイ (ii), and サウ (sau) as ソウ (sou).
But since  means the daily wages of day laborers in the dialect of Hanamaki, some people believe the true meaning of this verse is that Miyazawa cries out of sympathy with the poor farmers who have to work as day laborers.

 A memo with tanka about the Lotus Sutra was put in a thin roll in the cylinder part next to the notebook where the pencil was put.

See also
Buddhist poetry

References

External links
 Be not Defeated by the Rain, a translation by David Sulz
 Unperturbed by the Rain, a translation by Steven P. Venti
 Standing Up to the Rain, a translation from 
 Someone who is unfazed by the rain, a translation by Michael Brase

20th-century poems
Japanese poems
Works by Kenji Miyazawa
Articles containing Japanese poems
Buddhist poetry